Neptunia may refer to:
 Neptunia (plant), a genus of plants within the subfamily Mimoseae
 Neptunia (Darkwing Duck), a cartoon character in the television series Darkwing Duck
, an Italian coaster
Hyperdimension Neptunia, a video game series
Hyperdimension Neptunia (video game), a 2010 role-playing video game, the first game in the series
 Neptunia, a Roman colony at Taranto, Italy
 Neptunia, Uruguay, a resort location in Canelones Department, Uruguay